Alexandra Panova and Urszula Radwańska were the defending champions, but both players chose not to participate.

Seeds

Draw

Draw

References
 Main Draw

Open GDF Suez de Biarritz - Doubles